George Ramsay (1855–1935) was a Scottish football player and administrator, associated with Aston Villa FC.

George Ramsay may also refer to:
 George Ramsay (English Army officer) (1652–1705), English Army officer
 George Ramsay (footballer, born 1892) (1892–1918), Scottish footballer (Rangers FC, Partick Thistle FC)
 George Ramsay, 8th Earl of Dalhousie (died 1787)
 George Ramsay, 9th Earl of Dalhousie (1770–1838), Scottish soldier and colonial administrator
 George Ramsay, 12th Earl of Dalhousie (1806–1880), British naval officer
 George Gilbert Ramsay (1839–1921), professor at the University of Glasgow
 George D. Ramsay (1802–1882), U.S. Army officer
 George Ramsay known as Roy Ramsay (sailor) (born 1912) olympic sailor